The Georgian Declaration of Independence was the declaration of independence of the Democratic Republic of Georgia on 26 May 1918. It established a Georgian state from the Transcaucasian Democratic Federative Republic, a federation between Armenia, Azerbaijan, and Georgia in the wake of the 1917 Russian Revolution. It was proclaimed in Tiflis, the main city of Georgia and the new capital of Georgia.

Background
The Russian Revolution had seen the Caucasus region establish an independent state on 22 April 1918, the Transcaucasian Democratic Federative Republic (TDFR), a union of Armenia, Azerbaijan, and Georgia. However it only lasted until May 26 1918, as the Ottoman Empire invaded, and with political and ethnic differences the state was unable to sustain itself. With the Armenians fighting the Ottoman forces and the Azerbaijanis having their own issues with Bolsheviks controlling Baku, the Georgians concluded that they had no future in the TDFR. On 14 May Noe Jordania, a leading Georgian Menshevik went to Batumi to request German assistance to help secure Georgian independence. He returned to Tiflis on 21 May and expressed confidence that Georgia could become independent. The Armenian, Azerbaijani, and Georgian representatives from the Seim (TDFR legislature) met on 21 May to discuss the future of the TDFR and agreed that it was not likely to last much longer. The next day the Georgians met alone and resolved that independence was their only logical choice. Jordania and Zurab Avalishvili drafted a declaration of independence on 22 May, before Jordania left again for Batum to meet Otto von Lossow. On 24 May Von Lossow replied that he was only authorized to work with the TDFR as a whole; as it was becoming apparent that it would not last long, he would have to leave Trabzon and consult with his government on how to proceed further.

Declaration

On 26 May Irakli Tsereteli, another leading Menshevik, gave two speeches in the Seim. In the first, he explained that the TDFR was unable to continue as there was a lack of unity among the people and that ethnic strife led to a division of action in regards to the Ottoman invasion. In his second speech, Tsereteli blamed the Azerbaijanis for failing to support the defense of the TDFR and declared that as the federation had failed it was time for Georgia to proclaim itself independent. At 15:00 the motion was passed: "Because on the questions of war and peace there arose basic differences among the peoples who had created the Transcaucasian Republic, and because it became impossible to establish one authoritative order speaking in the name of all Transcaucasia, the Seim certifies the fact of the dissolution of Transcaucasia and lays down its powers." Most delegates left the chamber, with only the Georgians remaining, who were shortly joined by members of the Georgian National Council. Jordania then read the Georgian declaration of independence and proclaimed the Democratic Republic of Georgia. This was followed two days later with an Armenian declaration of independence, followed quickly by Azerbaijan doing the same, creating the Republic of Armenia and Azerbaijan Democratic Republic, respectively.

References

Bibliography

External links
 Georgian Declaration of Independence (in Georgian)

1918 documents
1918 establishments in Georgia (country)
1918 in Georgia (country)
1918 in international relations
Georgia 1918
History of Tbilisi
May 1918 events
Separatism in Russia